Zina Gelman Bash  is an American attorney who was a senior counsel to Texas Attorney General Ken Paxton in 2018.

Background and education
Bash is the daughter of Lawrence Gelman, an anesthesiologist and hospital executive. She was born in Monterrey, Mexico and raised in McAllen, Texas.

She is Catholic, although she also has  Jewish ancestry. Her father is the descendant of Holocaust survivors, while her mother is of Mexican descent.

In 2004, Bash received her Bachelor of Arts from Harvard University, where she served on the Undergraduate Council Election Commission. In 2007, she graduated with a Juris Doctor from Harvard Law School, where she was an editor of the Harvard Law Review. She also holds a Master of Business Administration from the University of Pennsylvania’s Wharton School.

Personal life
In 2007, she married John Bash, who served as the United States Attorney for the Western District of Texas from 2017 to 2020. They have a daughter and two sons.

Career
Bash clerked for Brett Kavanaugh, then judge of the United States Court of Appeals for the District of Columbia Circuit, and afterward for justice Samuel Alito of the United States Supreme Court during the 2013–14 term.

She has practiced law as an appellate attorney at Gibson, Dunn & Crutcher LLP and was executive vice president of operations and business development at Doctors Hospital at Renaissance in Edinburg, Texas.

She served as deputy director of Policy and Communications for U. S. Senator Ted Cruz’s 2016 Presidential campaign and Senior Counsel to the Senate Judiciary Committee in U.S. Senator John Cornyn’s office.

In 2017, Bash served in the Trump administration as Special Assistant to the President for regulatory reform, legal and immigration policy on the Domestic Policy Council. Prior to Trump taking office, she served on his agency landing team for the Department of Justice. In July 2018, she was named senior counsel on the executive leadership team of Texas Attorney General Ken Paxton, but had left by August to assist Judge Kavanaugh during his Supreme Court nomination hearing before the Senate.

See also
 List of law clerks of the Supreme Court of the United States (Seat 8)

References

1981 births
Living people
Texas lawyers
People from McAllen, Texas
21st-century American lawyers
Harvard Law School alumni
Wharton School of the University of Pennsylvania alumni
Law clerks of the Supreme Court of the United States
Trump administration personnel
American people of Polish-Jewish descent
American people of Mexican-Jewish descent
People associated with Gibson Dunn